Beta Columbae (β Columbae, abbreviated Beta Col, β Col), officially named Wazn , is the second-brightest star in the southern constellation of Columba. It has an apparent visual magnitude of 3.1, which is bright enough to be viewed with the naked eye even from an urban location.

Beta Columbae is the star's Bayer designation. It has the traditional name Wazn (or Wezn) from the Arabic وزن "weight". In 2016, the International Astronomical Union organized a Working Group on Star Names (WGSN) to catalog and standardize proper names for stars. The WGSN's first bulletin of July 2016 included a table of the first two batches of names approved by the WGSN; which included Wazn for this star.

Properties
The spectrum of Beta Columbae matches a stellar classification of K1 IIICN+1, where the 'III' luminosity class indicates this is a giant star that has exhausted the supply of hydrogen at its core and evolved away from the main sequence of stars like the Sun. The notation 'CN+1' indicates a higher than normal level of cyanogen (CN) absorption in the atmosphere of the star. Despite having expanded to this radius, Beta Columbae only has about a 10% greater mass than the Sun. The outer envelope of this star is radiating energy at an effective temperature of 4,545 K, resulting an orange hue that is typical of a cool, K-type star.

Beta Columbae has a high proper motion across the celestial sphere and is moving at an unusually large speed of  relative to the Sun. About 107,200 years ago, it made a close approach to the Beta Pictoris system.

References

Columba (constellation)
K-type giants
Columbae, Beta
039425
027628
CD-35 02546
Wazn
2040
TIC objects